A vetala or Betal is a Bhairava form of Shiva in Hindu mythology, usually defined as a knowledgeable (fortune telling) paranormal entity said to be dwelling at charnel grounds. The vetala is comparable to the vampires of Western mythology. Reanimated corpses are used as vehicles by the spirits for movement, the corpse no longer decays while it is inhabited by a vetala. A vetala may possess and also leave a dead body at will.

Description
In Hindu folklore, the vetala is an evil spirit who haunts cemeteries and takes demonic possession of corpses. They make their displeasure known by troubling humans. They can drive people mad, kill children, and cause miscarriages, but also guard villages.

They are hostile spirits of the dead trapped in the 'twilight zone' between life and afterlife. These creatures can be repelled by the chanting of mantras. One can free them from their ghostly existence by performing their funerary rites. Being unaffected by the laws of space and time, they have an uncanny knowledge about the past, present, and future and a deep insight into human nature. Therefore many sorcerers seek to capture them and turn them into slaves.

There is also a strong Vetala cult in the Konkan region, under the names of Betal, Vetal, Vetoba. Since Betal is said to be the brother of the goddess Shantadurga, there will be a temple dedicated in honour of Betal either within the temple complex of Shantadurga or somewhere in the sylvan surroundings. There is a Betal temple in Amona, Goa. Betal is a form of Bhairava and is the head of all spirits and ghouls and vampires and all kinds of pisachas. He has another form which is a more potent and fiery form, that of Agni Vetal who is the sevak of the goddess Kalika. Agni Vetal (Agya Vetal) has flames on his head and controls fire. Agni Vetal is used by Tantriks to perform evil black magic on people. But it isn't Lord Agnivetal's fault because the Tantriks misuse the powers given to them on propitiating Agnivetal (rather his Daityas which are at his feet-they are the ones who accept the blood sacrifices).

Literature
The Baital Pachisi or Vetala Tales is a collection of stories compiled no later than the 11th century. It features a frame story of a sorcerer who asked King Vikramaditya to capture a vetala who lived in a tree that stood in the middle of a cremation ground. The only way to do that was by keeping silent. Every time Vikramaditya caught the vetala, the vetala would enchant the king with a story that would end with a question. No matter how hard he tried, Vikramaditya would not be able to resist answering the question. This would enable the vetala to escape and return to his tree.

In popular culture 

Vikram Vetal, a 1986 Indian fantasy film directed by Shantilal Soni was based on the Baital Pachisi about King Vikramaditya and the Vetala.

Vikram Aur Betaal was a television programme based on the Baital Pachisi produced by Ramanand Sagar and directed by his son Prem Sagar that aired on DD National channel. It was remade as Kahaniya Vikram aur Betaal Ki in 2009 and aired on Colors TV. Vikram Betaal Ki Rahasya Gatha (2018), an Indian mythological serial based on Baital Pachisi aired on &TV. Indian animator Rajiv Chilaka directed Vikram Betal, a television film for Cartoon Network in 2004 which was produced by his Green Gold Animations. Vicky & Vetaal (2006–2007) and Vicky Aur Vetaal (2015–2016), which aired on Disney Channel India, also featured Vetala as the main character.

Vetala were also a part of The Secrets of the Immortal Nicholas Flamel and have appeared in television shows such as Supernatural season 7 episode 11, Adventures in Babysitting, Sleepy Hollow, Jekyll & Hyde, and a web series titled The Vetala released in 2009, written and directed by Damon Vignale. The 2020 Indian zombie horror series Betaal also features a curse of Vetala.

The Vetala (Linda Leith Publishing, 2018) is a novel by Canadian author Phillip Ernest. It tells the story of Nada, a professor of Sanskrit, who finds herself face to face with the imaginative vetala, the subject of her life-long study.

References

Sources 
 Dictionary of Hindu Lore and Legend by Anna Dallapiccola

Demons in Hinduism
Vampires
Corporeal undead
Revenants